James Hastie (1848 – 9 December 1897) was a British rower who won Silver Goblets at Henley Royal Regatta three times.

Early life and career 
Hastie was born at sea, and became a brewers agent in London.  He was a member of Thames Rowing Club where he was a long-standing captain. In 1877 Hastie with W Eyre won Silver Goblets at Henley Royal Regatta beating Frank Lumley Playford and S Le B Smith in the final. He was captain of Thames in 1878 when he was involved in meetings to set up the Amateur Rowing Association  and to set a definition for amateur.  In 1879 with Eyre he was runner-up in Silver Goblets to Francis Gulston and R H Labat. However Hastie and Eyre won Silver Goblets in 1880 beating Alexander Payne and F D Leader in the final and in 1881 beating Playford and P Adcock in the final. He spent the night of the census in 1881 at the Thames Clubhouse in Putney.

Hastie died in the Staines district at the age of 49.

References

1848 births
1897 deaths
English male rowers
British male rowers
People born at sea